Mian Margh (also Romanized as Mīān Margh and Mīān Morgh; also known as Mīān Morkh and Miyān Markh) is a village in Darzab Rural District, in the Central District of Mashhad County, Razavi Khorasan Province, Iran. At the 2006 census, its population was 159, in 36 families.

References 

Populated places in Mashhad County